Ninaivu Chinnam is a 1989 Indian Tamil-language film directed by Anu Mohan. The film stars Prabhu and Raadhika. It was released on 5 May 1989. Raadhika won the Tamil Nadu State Film Award for Best Actress.

Plot

Cast 
Prabhu as Rasappan
Raadhika
Murali as Muthu
Chithra
Vijayakumar
Goundamani as Kundalakesi
Senthil
S. S. Chandran

Soundtrack 
Soundtrack was composed by Ilaiyaraaja and lyrics were written by Ilaiyaraaja, Gangai Amaran and Piraisoodan.

References

External links 
 

1980 films
1980s Tamil-language films
1989 films
Films scored by Ilaiyaraaja